William Townesend of Oxford (1676–1739)  was a 17th/ 18th century British sculptor, architect and builder associated with several important British buildings.

His masterpiece is the Radcliffe Library in Oxford, completed by his son.

Life

He was baptised at St Giles's Church, Oxford on 17 December 1676, the son of John Townesend the Elder (1648-1728), who was a prominent mason who served as Mayor of Oxford in 1720/1. John's wife
was Elizabeth Morrell (d.1726) and William was one of four children.
His father was one of the main masons working on Blenheim Palace and nicknamed "Old Pincher". Townesend's eldest son, John Townesend the Younger (d.1742), was also a stonemason, with a yard in London, his most noteworthy structures being St Mary-le-Strand and the Mansion House, London.

William was apprenticed to his father and would have become a Freeman mason around 1690. By 1704 he was "college mason" to Christ Church, Oxford.

He died in Oxford on 22 September 1739. He is thought to be buried in the family plot in St Giles Churchyard in Oxford. His will was read on 5 October 1739, and is held in the National Archives at Kew.

Family

He was married to Mary around 1703.

Their son John (1709-1746) was also a stonemason and sculptor. Following his father's death in 1739 John completed the Radcliffe Library.

Architectural works
Remodelling at Carfax, Oxford (1707)
Peckwater Quadrangle of Queen's College, Oxford (1709)
Clarendon Building, Oxford (1712) under Nicholas Hawksmoor
Chapel and Hall at Queen's College, Oxford (1714) interior and exterior
Library at Queen's College, Oxford 
Link between Hall and Chapel (1718)
Remodelling interior of Chapel at All Souls College, Oxford (1719)
Altarpiece in Chapel (1719)
Major work at Blenheim Palace with Bartholomew Peisley (1721 onwards) in place of his elderly father to the designs of Hawksmoor
Grand Bridge at Blenheim (1721)
Triumphal Arch (Woodstock Gate) at Blenheim (1721)
Radley House (1721 to 1725)
Chapel interior at Blenheim (c.1723) 
Column of Victory in Blenheim Park (1727) to the designs of Henry Flitcroft
Hall and kitchen at All Souls College, Oxford (1729)
Cupola at Queen's College, Oxford (1733)
Radcliffe Camera with William Smith of Warwick (1737 until death) to the designs of James Gibbs

Monuments

Bust of John Wallis in St Mary's Church Oxford (1703)
Monument to Sir Thomas Powell in Llanbadarn near Aberystwyth (1706)
Bust of David Gregory in St Mary's Church Oxford (1708)
Monument to James and John Narborough in Oxford Cathedral (1708)
Monument to his father John Townesend in St Giles churchyard Oxford (1728)

Gallery

References
 

1739 deaths
People from Oxford
English sculptors
English architects